Tomáš Troliga (born 24 April 1984) is a Slovak professional ice hockey player who played with HK SKP Poprad in the Slovak Extraliga during the 2010–11 season.

Career statistics

Regular season and playoffs

International

External links

Living people
HK Poprad players
Slovak ice hockey forwards
Sportspeople from Prešov
St. Louis Blues draft picks
1984 births
Slovak expatriate ice hockey players in Canada
Slovak expatriate ice hockey players in the United States
Slovak expatriate ice hockey players in the Czech Republic